Megasport may refer to:

 Megasport Sports Palace, a sports and entertainment facility in Moscow, Russia
 FC Megasport, a soccer team based in Almaty, Kazakhstan
 Megasport, the former name of the Ukrainian television channel Mega
 Mega Sport, a sporting goods retailer in North Macedonia; see List of supermarket chains in North Macedonia

See also

 Ultra sport (disambiguation)
 Super sport (disambiguation)
 Hypersport (disambiguation)
 
 
 Sport (disambiguation)
 Mega (disambiguation)